The Leftwing Union for the Socialist Democracy was a Portuguese leftwing party founded in January 1978. The party has its origins in the Socialist Culture Association - Worker Brotherhood, a socialist organization and in groups of independent people linked  to the Socialist Party.

The party participated in the legislative election of 1980 in coalition with the Socialist Party and the Independent Social Democratic Action in the Republican and Socialist Front. In the subsequent elections, the party's members integrated the lists of the Socialist Party. In the Presidential election of 1986 the UEDS members split, one part supporting Mário Soares and the other supporting Maria de Lurdes Pintasilgo.

The party was disbanded in 1986 and some of its members joined the Socialist Party.

References

Defunct socialist parties in Portugal
Political parties established in 1978
Political parties disestablished in 1986
1978 establishments in Portugal
1986 disestablishments in Portugal